Worsley is a town in the City of Salford Metropolitan Borough, Greater Manchester, England.  The town, together with the areas of Walkden and Little Hulton, contains 56 listed buildings that are recorded in the National Heritage List for England.  Of these, two are listed at Grade I, the highest of the three grades, and the others are at Grade II, the lowest grade.

Worsley was an ancient manor, and coal was mined there from the 14th century.  In the 18th century the 3rd Duke of Bridgewater introduced a canal system to transport the coal to Manchester, which developed into the Bridgewater Canal.  The earlier listed buildings are houses and other structures in the manor.  Many of the later listed buildings are associated with the coal mine and canal system, and are houses and other buildings that later developed as a result of it.


Key

Buildings

References

Citations

Sources

Lists of listed buildings in Greater Manchester
Buildings and structures in the City of Salford